Jean Morrison may refer to:
 Jean Morrison (musician)
 Jean Morrison (professor)